Maria Clementina Sobieska (18 July 1702 – 18 January 1735) was a titular queen of England, Scotland and Ireland by marriage to James Francis Edward Stuart, a Jacobite claimant to the British throne. The granddaughter of the Polish king John III Sobieski, she was the mother of Charles Edward Stuart, aka "Bonnie Prince Charlie", and of Cardinal Henry Benedict Stuart.

Biography

Early life
She was born on  18 July 1702 in Oława (Ohlau), Silesia, then part of the Holy Roman Empire and now in Poland. Her parents were James Louis Sobieski (1667–1737), the eldest son of King John III, and Countess Palatine Hedwig Elisabeth of Neuburg (1673–1722). Her older sister Maria Karolina (known as Charlotte) was the Duchess of Bouillon by marriage.

Marriage
Being one of Europe's wealthiest heiresses from inheriting vast estates in Poland from her paternal grandfather, she was betrothed to James Francis Edward Stuart. King George I of Great Britain was opposed to the marriage because he feared that the union might produce heirs to James Francis Edward's claim to his thrones. To placate him, the Holy Roman Emperor Charles VI (Maria Clementina's own maternal first cousin) had her arrested while on her way to Italy to marry James Francis Edward. She was confined in Innsbruck Castle but eventually the guards were deceived and, with the help of Charles Wogan, Maria Clementina escaped to Bologna, where, for safety from further intrusions, she was married by proxy to James, who was in Spain at that time. Maria Clementina's father, James Louis Sobieski, approved her escape, declaring that, as she became engaged to James Francis Edward, she ought to "follow his fortune and his cause".

Maria Clementina and James Francis Edward were formally married on 3 September 1719 in the chapel of the episcopal palace of Montefiascone, Italy, in the Cathedral of Santa Margherita. Following their marriage, James and Maria Clementina were invited to reside in Rome at the special request of Pope Clement XI, who acknowledged them as the king and queen of England, Scotland and Ireland.

Titular queen
The Pope provided them with a papal guard of troops and gave them the Palazzo Muti in the Piazza dei Santi Apostoli in Rome to live in, as well as a country villa at Albano. The Catholic Church also provided them with an annual allowance of 12,000 crowns out of the papal treasury. Popes Clement XI and Innocent XIII considered James and Maria Clementina, both Catholics, the rightful king and queen of England, Scotland and Ireland.

The married life of James and Maria Clementina proved turbulent and unhappy. Reportedly, James initially had a favourable impression of her because of her beauty, while she disliked him because of his lack of it, as well as his passive nature. She befriended the governess of her son, a Mrs Sheldon, who became her confidant and favourite. On the other hand, she disliked the influence of James's favourite John Hay of Cromlix and his wife Marjorie, and reportedly, she suspected James of having an affair with Marjorie Hay.

In 1725, soon after their second child's birth, James fired Sheldon and appointed James Murray as the guardian of their sons against the wishes of Maria Clementina. She left him and went to live in convent of St. Cecilia in Rome with her favourite Sheldon and the rest of her personal retinue. 
She accused her husband of adultery, while he said it was sinful to leave him and her children. Upon the advice of Cardinal Alberoni, who claimed it was her only chance to gain support against her husband, Maria Clementina claimed that James wished to give his son a Protestant education. This claim secured her the support of the Pope as well as the Kingdom of Spain against James and the sympathy of the public when she demanded that James remove the Duke of Dunbar and the Hays from his court and reinstate Sheldon in her position. In April 1726, James granted her sons permission to visit her. The whole affair was seen as a scandal in Europe and reported about by anti-Jacobite agents in Rome. In May 1727, through the mediation of the duke of Liria, James removed the Hay couple from his court, and in January 1728, Maria Clementina and James reconciled in Bologna.

In practice, however, Maria Clementina and James lived the rest of their marriage separated: James preferred to reside in Albano, while Maria Clementina lived in the Palazzo Muti in Rome.
She was prone to depression, spending much of her time praying and submitting to religious fasting and other Catholic ascetic rituals, which is thought to have played a role in the fact that she never conceived again. Her sexual relations with James soon discontinued; they seldom dined together, and though they were officially reconciled, she preferred to avoid him outside formal occasions.
Maria Clementina did perform the ceremonial functions she had as Jacobite queen: in June 1729, for example, she gave an audience for Montesquieu. Her favourite Mrs Sheldon did not officially reside at the Jacobite court, but she provided her with a residence close to it, and kept her as a confidante. Her relation to her younger son was not close, as he was his father's favourite, but she was close to their elder son Charles, who was his mother's favourite: during an illness of Charles in 1732, for example, Maria Clementina tended to him despite the fact that he fell ill in Albano and she was thus forced to meet James.

Death
Her health was weakened by her ascetic life style and deteriorated as the years went by. Maria Clementina died at the early age of 32 on 18 January 1735. Her doctor named the cause of death as 'scorbutic disease', more commonly known as scurvy. She was interred with full royal honours in St. Peter's Basilica in Rome. Pope Clement XII ordered that she have a state burial. Pope Benedict XIV commissioned architect Filippo Barigioni to design a monument for her memory, Pietro Bracci sculpted a statue for it, and it was erected 1742 in the Basilica.

Issue
Maria Clementina and James Francis Edward had two sons:

Charles Edward Louis Philip John Casimir Stuart (31 December 1720 – 31 January 1788), aka "Bonnie Prince Charlie", married Louise of Stolberg-Gedern and had no issue; had affair with his cousin Marie Louise de La Tour d'Auvergne and had issue; had issue with his mistress Clementina Walkinshaw;
Henry Benedict Maria Clement Thomas Francis Xavier Stuart (11 March 1725 – 13 July 1807), later known as the Cardinal Duke of York, never married.

Ancestry

Gallery

References

External links
Nuptials of Maria Klementyna Sobieska at the Wilanów Palace Museum
 Gaetano Platania, Angielskie małżeństwo ;arii Klementyny Sobieskiej, in "Sobótka", 2, 1980, pp. 401–410.
 Gaetano Platania, Morte di Maria Clementina Sobieska Stuart: il caso di Michele Marieschi progettista di apparati funebri, in ARTE/Documento. Rivista di Storia e tutela dei Beni Culturali, 4, 1990, pp. 164–173.
 Gaetano Platania, La politica europea e il matrimonio inglese di una principessa polacca: Maria Clementina Sobieska, Accademia Polacca delle Scienze-Biblioteca e Centro Studi a Roma, Manziana (Roma), Vecchiarelli editore, 1993.
 Gaetano Platania, Viaggio a Roma sede d'esilio. Sovrane alla conquista di Roma: secoli XVII-XVIII, Istituto Nazionale di Studi Romani, Roma 2002, pp. 99–118.

1702 births
1735 deaths
Maria Clementina
Maria Clementina
Jacobites
18th-century Polish–Lithuanian novelists
18th-century Polish women
Burials at St. Peter's Basilica
Polish people of German descent